Richard Socarides is head of global corporate communications and government affairs for Gerson Lehrman Group (GLG). Previously, he led communications at New Line Cinema and has held other senior media jobs at Time Warner, AOL and in government and politics. He is also an American Democratic political strategist, writer for The New Yorker, TV commentator and a New York attorney. He was a White House adviser under United States President Bill Clinton from 1993 to 1999 in a variety of senior positions, including as Special Assistant to the President and Senior Adviser for Public Liaison. He worked on legal, policy and political issues and served as principal adviser to Clinton on gay and lesbian civil rights issues. Under Clinton, he was chief operating officer of the 50th Anniversary Summit of the North Atlantic Treaty Organization (NATO). Socarides also worked as special assistant to Senator Tom Harkin (D-Iowa).

Socarides has written extensively on political and legal topics in his regular column in The New Yorker, as well as for The Washington Post, The Wall Street Journal, and Politico. He is a frequent commentator on television.

Socarides is a Trustee of the State University of New York (SUNY), appointed by Governor Andrew Cuomo and of Antioch College, which he attended.

Socarides, who is openly gay, was the founding president of Equality Matters in 2011. He is the son of Charles Socarides (1922–2005), a psychiatrist and psychoanalyst who was an outspoken critic of the American Psychiatric Association's 1973 decision to remove homosexuality from its list of mental disorders. In 1992 the elder Socarides co-founded NARTH, in response to the American Psychoanalytic Association's 1992 decision to change its position on homosexuality.

Biography 

Socarides held senior positions in the media and entertainment sector and in government and law – as a media relations and communications executive, as a presidential adviser at the White House and as a partner in a New York City law firm.

Legal career 

From 1984 to 1990, Socarides was an associate, then a partner, at the New York law firm of Squadron, Ellenoff, Plesent & Sheinfeld. He graduated from Hofstra University School of Law and Antioch College. Socarides has served on a wide variety of non-profit boards, including those of organizations devoted to civil rights, historic preservation and urban renewal, music and philanthropy.

Socarides served as Of Counsel to the New York law firm of Brady Klein & Weissman, from 2009 to 2013.

Political career 

Socarides served on national political campaigns, as deputy director for Public Liaison for Clinton/Gore '96 and as Political Director and Senior Advisor for U.S. Senator Tom Harkin in 1991–92. He also served on Tom Harkin's U.S. Senate staff.

From 1993 to 1999, Socarides worked as a White House advisor in a variety of senior positions. He served as Special Assistant to the President and Senior Advisor for Public Liaison and also as chief operating officer of the 50th Anniversary Summit of the North Atlantic Treaty Organization (NATO). He coordinated communications and event strategy, policy and community outreach relating to key initiatives and represented the President and articulated administration policy in public appearances.

Corporate career
In 2000, Socarides was Senior Vice President at Robinson Lerer & Montgomery Strategic Communications, a New York consulting firm. He provided media relations, branding, marketing, public policy and crisis management advice to domestic and international Fortune 100 companies, principally in the media and entertainment sectors, including American Online, NBC and Bertelsmann, among others.

Socarides served as vice president for Corporate Relations at AOL Time Warner (now Time Warner), where he was a senior member of the executive team responsible for planning and positioning the company's corporate social responsibility strategy and its community outreach program. He also managed media relations and internal communications in support of these initiatives. During this same period, Socarides also served as Vice President of the AOL Time Warner Foundation, the philanthropic arm of the company, in which capacity he was responsible for building a brand franchise around the company's philanthropic initiatives and helping to oversee an annual budget of $20 million in corporate giving.

As Senior Vice President at New Line Cinema and as head of its corporate communications department, Socarides was responsible for managing corporate press and media relations, as well as communications strategy and reputation management for the company and its senior executives. He was a member of the team that developed the Academy Award campaign for The Lord of the Rings: The Return of the King. It won 11 Oscars, tying the record for most ever, including Best Picture.

Socarides was named Head of Public Affairs for Gerson Lehrman Group in August 2013.

Media portrayal
A portion of Socarides's time in the Clinton administration was portrayed by his (much) younger brother, Charles Socarides Jr., in the 2017 American Broadcasting Company docudrama miniseries When We Rise.

Articles and opinion pieces
 Where's Our 'Fierce Advocate'? The Washington Post, May 2, 2009.
 Ask Obama About Don't Ask, Don't Tell: Gay voters are growing impatient for equality.  The Wall Street Journal, January 24, 2010.
 Obama Is Missing in Action on Gay Rights: Ted Olson is on the right side of history. When will the president step up? The Wall Street Journal, June 25, 2010.
 A way forward on gay marriage.  Politico.com, August 18, 2010.
 The Choice to Defend DOMA, and Its Consequences.  AmericaBlog.com, June 14, 2009.
 A Summer for Gay Rights.  HuffingtonPost.com, June 18, 2010.
 ""Exactly Why We Have Courts, Why We Have the Constitution and Why We Have the 14th Amendment".  HuffingtonPost.com, January 11, 2010.
 Why Equality Matters.  Equality Matters, December 19, 2010.
 
 Book chapters

References

Sources
 Bull, Chris (July 11, 1999), "His Public Domain, His Private Pain," Washington Post Magazine, pp. 18 et seq.

External links 
Equality Matters official website

1954 births
Antioch College alumni
Maurice A. Deane School of Law alumni
Living people
Place of birth missing (living people)
American LGBT rights activists
New York (state) lawyers
American political consultants
Clinton administration personnel
American media critics
American political writers
American male non-fiction writers
American gay writers
Trustees of the State University of New York
LGBT lawyers